The Battle of Adrianople occurred around Adrianople on April 14, 1205 between Bulgarians, Vlachs and Cumans under Tsar Kaloyan of Bulgaria, and Crusaders under Baldwin I, who only months before had been crowned Emperor of Constantinople, allied with Venetians under Doge Enrico Dandolo. The battle was won by the Bulgarian Empire after a successful ambush.

Background 
Due to the financial difficulties of the Crusaders, who could not repay the leases on Venetian shipping, the Doge of Venice, Enrico Dandolo, suggested that the armies of the Fourth Crusade deviate from their intended goal of Jerusalem. Instead of continuing onwards, on the 12–13 April, year 1204 AD, the capital of the Byzantine Empire, Constantinople, was captured and sacked. Numerous cultural treasures were either destroyed or stolen, such as sacred texts, relics, manuscripts, icons, archives, works of art, as well as much wealth. The heart of Orthodox Christianity suffered irreparable damage, both from the sack, and the fires caused by the Crusader siege, which torched more than 2/3 of the city. The capture of Constantinople created the Latin Empire, which initially only controlled the environs of Constantinople and the province of Thrace, but eventually expanded into Bithynia, Thessaly and central and southern Greece.

Around the same time, Tsar Kaloyan, the Tsar of Bulgaria, successfully completed negotiations with Pope Innocent III. The Bulgarian ruler was recognized as  "rex", i.e. emperor (tsar), while the Bulgarian archbishop regained the title "primas", a title equal to that of patriarch.

Despite the apparently good relations between Tsar Kaloyan and the new Western European conquerors, immediately after settling down in Constantinopole, the Latins stated their pretensions on Bulgarian lands. Latin knights began crossing the border to pillage Bulgarian towns and villages. These belligerent actions convinced the Bulgarian Emperor that an alliance with the Latins was impossible and that it was necessary to find allies from among the Greeks of Thrace that had yet to be conquered by the knights. In the winter of 1204-1205 messengers of the local Greek aristocracy visited Kaloyan and an alliance was formed.

In the spring of 1205, Didymoteicho and Adrianople revolted, followed soon after by the entirety of Thrace. Emperor Baldwin I marched his army north and reached Adrianople by the end of March.

The siege 
The Latins did not attack the castle head on; rather, they began a prolonged siege, in order to tire the defenders. By surrounding the city with siege machinery and digging mines under the walls, they greatly weakened the defences and patiently waited for an opening.  The main forces of Latin knights created well-structured guarded camps around the city to spot and ward off any aid that may have come. In front of each gate of the castle walls a unit was placed, which notably included a Venetian contingent led by  Doge Enrico Dandolo.

Honouring his obligations to the rebellious Greeks, Tsar Kaloyan arrived with his army and encamped approximately 25 kilometers northeast of the city on April 10, 1205. According to Geoffrey of Villehardouin, a French historian and knight who had accompanied the Crusaders to the Balkans, the army consisted of up to 54,000 men.

Location of the battle 
Numerous researchers pinpoint the location of the battle north of Adrianople and near the keep of Vukelon - K. Jireče, V. Guzelev, St. Boyadjiev - yet there is no conclusive evidence.

According to Niketas Choniates, a Byzantine historian, in the day of the battle Tsar Kaloyan chose the place of the ambush in the following manner: "After which Yoan and his army hid in the ravines, entered the precipice and through those steep places crept to the highlands, making sure their opponents did not notice they were there". In other scriptures, it reads "...and hid in the narrows in the shadowy forests".

Tricked by the Cuman cavalry, the knights chased them for at least two leagues before reaching the place of the ambush, which is between 7 and 9 kilometers, depending on which French league Geoffrey of Villehardouin was using. According to Alberic of Trois-Fontaines, the location of the battle was "plentiful with water marshes".

Nowadays, the most common site that is pointed as the place of the battle are the meanders of the Tùndzha river.

The forces 
Army of Tsar/King Kaloyan

According to the French historian Geoffrey of Villehardouin, the Bulgarian army numbered around 54,000 strong. Within that army were also the Vlachs,
and light cavalry of the Cumans, which, at that time, were allies or mercenaries of Kaloyan, as the Tsar himself was married to the Cuman princess Anna. The French historian points out that there were about 14,000 of them and that "... they were not christened". Nonetheless, their cavalry played a key role in the battle.

Army of the Latin Empire and Venice

The Latin army at Adrianople had about 300 knights. They were accompanied by a number of cavalry and infantry (likely no more than 1000-1500 soldiers) and the Venetian forces, which, according to some sources, also numbered 1000-1500. The total number of troops was no greater than four thousand, yet it is not clear how many soldiers took part in the battle and how many stayed under the walls to continue the siege.

Geoffrey of Villehardouin points out that the majority of the knights, each with his own unit, as well as all the Venetians chased after the Cumans and Vlachs and directly into the Bulgarian ambush. Many names of knights who fought in the battle are mentioned: Emperor Baldwin I, Louis I, Count of Blois, Bishop Peter of Bethlehem, Stephen of Perche, Reno of Mentimirel, Robert of Ronsoa, Ustas of Umont, Count Jerar of Lombardy, Jan of Mazerol and others. According to the same historian, the entirety of the Venetian forces takes part in the battle, being led by Doge Enrico Dandolo himself.

Forces of Adrianople and Thrace

Albeit they do not take part in the battle itself, all of the Byzantine rebels from East Thrace had gathered at Adrianopole and stood bravely to defend its wall from the conquerors. Their numbers are unknown.

The battle 
The battle was fought for two days, one week after the Orthodox Easter celebration.

The first day, 13 April 1205

On the 13th of April Kaloyan sends the Cuman cavalry to scout and for a "test attack" against the knights. The Cumans land a surprise attack on Emperor Baldwin I and the wrathful knights strike a skillful counter-attack, to which the cavalry immediately turns around and "apparently flees". Thus begins a long chase, with which Kaloyan successfully lures the knights out of their camps. After a prolonged run, the Cumans sharply turn around and begin firing arrows at the stampeding enemy, which take a heavy toll on the latter, as many people and war horses are killed. Realizing their own foolishness, the knights decide to stand their ground and wait for the attack of the Bulgarians. Baldwin makes the decision to wait for all of the remaining knights and soldiers to gather and prepare for a proper battle, which would take place after the upcoming Easter celebrations.

During the preparation for the ambush, the Bulgarians dig the so-called "wolf pits", in order to create an obstacles for the movement and battle formation of the heavy cavalry knights. Within the ambush Kaloyan places the infantry, whilst the reserve is made up of heavy cavalry, in case the former begins to give in to the Latins. The light Cuman cavalry is given the order to lead the knights to the trap.

The same night Baldwin calls for a meeting with all of the present barons and leaders of the Fourth Crusade. They make the decision that, in the case of a new attack by the Cumans, the army must not follow, rather, they must make a battle line formation in front of the camp.

The second day, 14 April 1205

On Thursday, 14 April 1205, during the celebration of the Catholic Easter, the Cuman light cavalry sweepingly attacks the camp of the knights with arrows, loud yells and ringing of steel. Outraged by this sacrilege, the knights grab their weapons, saddle up and get into battle formation. Despite the plan made in advance, Count Louis I of Blois does not wait for the rest of the army and charges ahead with his unit after the much faster light cavalry of the Cumans. Misled by this, the other soldiers, already blinded by anger, follow his lead. Because of this, the army leaves their stronghold behind and begins a chase, which inevitably leads to them reaching the ambush. Due to the speed of their cavalry, several times the Cumans have to stop and wait for the raging heavy cavalry of their enemy to catch up, after which they have a mock fight and flee again. This lasts until they reach the ambush, located in a ravine among hills.

Once gone safely past the pits, the Cumans turn around, presumably prepared for a serious fight. Yet when the knights come charging in with their characteristic formation and galloping storm, many of the horses fall together with their riders in the "wolf pits". This halts the attack, creating turmoil and confusion among the attackers. Now having enough time, the Bulgarian infantry placed in ambush comes out and completely surrounds the knights. When Baldwin arrives with the rest of the 200 knights, it is already too late. His attempts to break through the encirclement and free Count Louis are futile. Seeing this, Kaloyan, in turn, attacks and surrounds Baldwin with his heavy cavalry, isolating the knights in two small groups. With a broken formation, surrounded and unable to cooperate with each other, the knights are completely annihilated. In order to accomplish this, the Bulgarians use ropes and hooked polearms. With these weapons they are successful in unhorsing the knights who are then finished off with swords, hammers and axes.

Despite everything, the battle is hard and fought until late in the evening. The main part of the Latin army is eliminated, the knights are defeated and their emperor, Baldwin I, is taken prisoner in Veliko Tarnovo, where he is locked at the top of a tower in the Tsarevets fortress.

Aftermath 
The end of Emperor Baldwin I

After his capture by the Bulgarians, the fate of Emperor Baldwin I was unknown to his subjects and, during his absence, Henry, his brother, assumed regency. Whilst it is known that Baldwin died in captivity, the precise circumstances around his death are unknown. He was apparently initially treated as a valuable prisoner, but was later left to die in one of the towers of Tsarevets, where he was being held. There are many legends regarding his demise, with the most famous being that his demise was due to trying to seduce Kaloyan's wife. The historian George Acropolites reports that the Tsar had Baldwin's skull made into a drinking cup, just as had happened to Nicephorus I almost four hundred years before, yet no evidence has been found to confirm this, unlike the case with Nicephorus I. What is known with certainty, however, is that Kaloyan informed both Pope Innocent III and Baldwin's court of the Emperor's death in prison. A tower of the Tsarevets fortress of the medieval Bulgarian capital, Veliko Tarnovo, is still called Baldwin's Tower.

The Knights's honour and the fall of the Latin Empire

Word quickly spread around Europe of the defeat of the knights in the battle of Adrianople. Without a doubt, it was a great shock for the world at the time, due to the fact that the glory of the undefeatable knight army was known to everyone from those in rags to those in riches. Hearing that the knights, whose fame travelled far and wide, who had taken one of the largest cities at the time, Constantinople, the capital whose walls were rumoured to be unbreakable, was devastating for the Catholic world.
Due to being stripped from their aureole, the knights were no longer viewed as a power one could not find a way to oppose. Only a year after the battle of Adrianople, a devastating blow was dealt to the Latin Empire, a wound that would lead to its ultimate demise.

Kaloyan the Roman-slayer

Two years after the battle of Adrianople, Kaloyan set out to burn other Latin cities and cities of Byzantine rebels, who had begun to conspire against him. Albeit it was a bloody deed, the Byzantian historian George Akropolites gives the following explanation as to why the tsar gave the orders:
"He was exacting revenge, as they say, for the evil, which Basil II did against the Bulgarians; and, as he said, as Basil dubbed himself the Bulgarian-slayer, he named himself the Roman-slayer..."

Citations

References 
 DeVries, Kelly. Battles of the Crusades 1097-1444: From Dorylaeum to Varna. New York: Barnes & Noble, 2007. 
 [http://www.promacedonia.org/vz3/vz3_1_5.htm История на българската държава през средните векове. Том III. Второ българско царство. България при Асеневци (1187—1280), I. Освобождение и обединение на българските земи, 5. Отношенията на Калоян към латинци и ромеи] by Васил Н. Златарски
 История на България. Том ІІІ. Втора българска държава, издателство на БАН, София, 1982
 Българските ханове и царе VII-XIV век. Историко-хронологичен справочник, Държавно издателство Петър Берон, София, 1988, Йордан Андреев
 Weir, William. 50 Battles That Changed the World: The Conflicts That Most Influenced the Course of History''. New York: Barnes & Noble, 2005.
 Александър Стоянов. Колко големи са били армиите в Средновековна България?

1205 in Europe
Battles involving the Second Bulgarian Empire
Battles involving the Latin Empire
Battles of the Fourth Crusade
Bulgarian–Latin Wars
13th century in Bulgaria
Conflicts in 1205
History of Edirne